In Tongues may refer to:

 Glossolalia or speaking in tongues is the phenomenon of speaking in unintelligible utterances (often as part of religious practices).

Music 

 In Tongues (Dark Sermon album), 2013
 In Tongues (Ella Hooper album), 2014
In Tongues (Joji EP), 2017